Mission 3:16 is an album by Carman. Released in 1998 on Sparrow Records, the album peaked at number 94 on the Billboard 200 chart.
The album was nominated for a 1999 Grammy Award in the Best Pop/Contemporary Gospel Album category.

Track listing 
 All Songs Written By Carman, except where noted.
 "Mission 3:16" - 4:11
 "People of God" - 4:09
 "Legendary Mission" - 1:42
 "Never Be" - 3:36
 "Jesus is the Lamb" - 5:11
 "Post Lamb Jam" - 0:05
 "The Courtroom" - 6:47 (Carman, Carl Marsh)
 "Surf Mission" - 1:14
 "Do I Do" - 2:55
 "We Are Not Ashamed" - 4:21
 "The Prayer Anthem" - 3:30
 "Missione D'Italiano" - 1:00
 "Slam" - 4:05
 "All In Life" - 3:14
 "Kingdom Suite" - 1:21

Personnel 
 Andrea Baca, Lisa Bevill, Lisa Bragg, Lisa Cochran, Todd Cooper, John Hartman, Phil Keaggy, Bonnie Keen, Danielle Kimmey, Tony Orlando, Out of Eden, Joey Richey, Calvin Smith, Kristine & William Stroupe, Russ Taff, Tina Vallejo, Aimee Joy Weimer, Lori Wilshire: backing vocals; arranged by Andrea Baca, Lisa Bragg, Danielle Kimmey & Out of Eden
 Chris Willis, Chris & Matthew White, Emily Webb, Roz Clark Thompson, Kelly Stewart, Traci Sterling, Nicol Sponberg, Lauren Smyth, Kristen Pope, George Pendergrass, Tiffany Palmer, Gene Miller, Ashley Melling, Michael Mellett, Cory Hutchinson, Brittany Hargest, Tabitha Fair, Tim Davis, Stacy Campbell, Evan Broder: choir & chorus; arranged by Dan Cleary
 Jim Butler: rap & backing vocals
 Jonathan Carrey, Matthew Porter: rap
 Micah Wilshire: guitars, backing vocals
 Dave Perkins: guitars & synthesizers
 Kenny Vaughan, Brent Rowan, Jerry McPherson, Tom Hemby, George Cocchini, Mark Baldwin: guitars
 Bruce Bouton: steel guitar
 Tim Akers: keyboards
 Byron Hagen: Hammond organ
 Phil Madeira: Keyboards & Farfisa organ
 Bo Cooper: piano, backing vocals
 Michael Bragg, Danny Duncan, Carl Marsh, Tony Miracle, Tommy Sims, Brian Tankersley: programming
 Byron House: bass
 Michael Clarke, Dan Needham, Scott Williamson: drums
 Eric Darken: percussion
 John Mock: Bodhran & tin whistle
 Joey Miskulin: accordion
 Jeff Bailey, Alan Brown, Barry Green, Mike Haynes, Sam Levine, Chris McDonald, Steve Patrick, Calvin Smith: horns; arranged by Steve Patrick & Carl Marsh
 Strings & orchestra arranged by Tom Howard

References 

Carman (singer) albums
1998 albums